Marine Corps Outlying Field Oak Grove is an auxiliary airport of the United States Marine Corps located near Pollocksville, North Carolina. It was opened on 4 May 1943 during World War II as an outlying field of Marine Corps Air Station Cherry Point. During the war numerous fighter squadrons to include VMF-321 and VMF-323 trained at Oak Grove prior to deploying. After the war, Oak Grove and Marine Corps Auxiliary Airfield Kinston were the MCAS Cherry Point outlying fields to remain open. On 15 June 1947 Oak Grove became a permanent OLF of Cherry Point and today is used for helicopter, tilt-rotor and AV-8B Harrier training.

Citations

Bibliography

External links 
  Abandoned & Little-Known Airfields: Oak Grove Marine Corps Outer Landing Field (13NC)
 

Airports in North Carolina
Buildings and structures in Jones County, North Carolina
Military installations in North Carolina
United States Marine Corps air stations